CFFR (660 AM) is a Canadian AM radio station broadcasting at 660 kHz in Calgary, Alberta, and began broadcasting on January 10, 1984. As of April 3, 2006, it operates in an all-news format, branded as CityNews 660. It is a Class B, 50,000 watt station broadcasting on the clear-channel frequency of 660 AM. CFFR's studios are located on 7th Avenue Southwest in downtown Calgary, while its transmitters are located near Okotoks.

Previously, CFFR had operated a gold-based adult contemporary station entitled 66 CFR. "CFR" initially stood for "Calgary Family Radio" (with the additional "F" in the call sign being incidental), and later for "Calgary Flames Radio", although game coverage moved to sister station CFAC upon its relaunch as all-sports. The first song they played was at 7:16 am, was "A Hard Day's Night" by the Beatles after signing on with the station stunting with a sound of a clock ticking, CFFR's announcements with the same early 1980's jingles as CFTR in Toronto, and various number 1 songs from 1964 to 1983; and it was an ode to the work they had done just to get the station up and running. "66 CFR" during its early years played various hits from the late 1950s to the 1980s. The last song played before the format change was "We Built This City" by Starship. The announcement of 66 CFR leaving the air was accompanied by the closing chord of the Beatles' "A Day in the Life", which had also been the first sound heard at the start of the production piece introducing the station.

As of winter 2020, CFFR is the 11th-most-listened-to radio station in the Calgary market according to a PPM data report released by Numeris.

In June 2021, Rogers announced that it would rebrand CFFR and its other all-news and news/talk radio stations under the CityNews brand beginning October 18, 2021. The radio station's website is co-branded with CityNews and includes reporting from Citytv Calgary's newscasts.

Past station logos

References

External links
 660 News
 CFFR history - Canadian Communications Foundation

FFR
FFR
FFR
Radio stations established in 1984
1984 establishments in Alberta